Mnesictena flavidalis is a moth in the family Crambidae. It was described by Edward Doubleday in 1843. It is endemic to New Zealand.

Taxonomy 
This species was first described by Edward Doubleday in Ernst Dieffenbach's book Travels in New Zealand: with contributions to the geography, geology, botany and natural history of the country and named Margaritia flavidalis. In 1899 Hampson placed this species in the genus Mnesictena. In 1983 G. E. Munroe synonymised the genus Mnesictena with Udea. However in 1988 John S. Dugdale treated Mnesictena as a valid genus. Dugdale's treatment was followed in 2011 by Richard Mally and Matthias Nuss. The male holotype specimen, collected in Auckland by A. Sinclair, is held at the Natural History Museum, London.

Description 
Doubleday described this species as follows:

References

Moths described in 1843
flavidalis
Moths of New Zealand
Endemic fauna of New Zealand
Taxa named by Edward Doubleday
Endemic moths of New Zealand